John Jones (9 April 1921 – May 2001) was a Welsh professional footballer who played as an inside forward. He made appearances in the English Football League with Wrexham, Doncaster Rovers and New Brighton.

References

1921 births
2001 deaths
Welsh footballers
English Football League players
Wrexham A.F.C. players
Doncaster Rovers F.C. players
New Brighton A.F.C. players
Ellesmere Port Town F.C. players
Association football inside forwards